North Wejinabikun Lake is a lake in the Lake Superior drainage basin in Algoma District, Ontario, Canada. The primary inflow is the Magpie River from Wejinabikun Lake, and the primary outflow is the same river, which flows downstream towards Mosambik Lake, and eventually into Lake Superior.

See also
List of lakes in Ontario

References

Lakes of Algoma District